Scleddau is a village and a community in the county of Pembrokeshire, Wales, and is  south of Fishguard on the main A40 road. The Western Cleddau river which lends its name to the village flows under the main road. There are several springs in the village.

In 2011 the population of Scleddau was 1,013 with 34.2 per cent able to speak Welsh.

History
Castell Hendre-Wen and the round barrow on Jordanston Hill are both prehistoric scheduled monuments dating back to the early Iron Age.  east of Scleddau, and within the community, is the Grade II* listed Llanstinan parish church, dedicated to St Justinian. Scleddau sits at the tripoint of three ancient parishes: Llanstinan, Manorowen and Fishguard, and was historically within Manorowen parish.

In the 1840s, the village became involved in the disputes known as the Rebecca riots. On 27 June 1843 the tollgate at Scleddau on the turnpike between Haverfordwest and Fishguard was attacked and destroyed by a large number of people.

Listed buildings
Sion Chapel was built in 1859 and is a Grade II listed building, one of 24 listed buildings in the community.

Governance
In 2011, Trecwn community was amalgamated with (absorbed into) Scleddau community. An electoral ward in the same name exists. This ward stretches to the coast at Strumble Head with a total population of 1,487.

References

External links

Scleddau Community Council

Communities in Pembrokeshire
Villages in Pembrokeshire